Anauyá is an extinct, poorly attested and unclassified Arawakan language. Kaufman (1994) placed it in his Wainumá branch, but this is not followed in Aikhenvald (1999).

References

Indigenous languages of the South American Northern Foothills
Arawakan languages